A charrette (or charette or design charrette) is a term describing a period of intense design activity, often immediately preceding a deadline.

Charrette may also refer to:

 Charrette, the French word for cart
 La Charrette,  the smallest cinema in the UK, built from a disused railway carriage
 "Lancelot, the Knight of the Cart" or "Lancelot, le Chevalier de la Charrette", an Old French poem by Chrétien de Troyes

See also
Charette (disambiguation)

fr:Charrette